A Matter of Attitude is the second album by Danish rock band Fate, released in 1986.

The album was in the hook-filled melodic hard rock/pop metal vein, featuring tight vocal harmonies over a strong rhythm section, guitar, and sweeping synthesizer.  Stylistically it was like Europe with a bit more bite. "Won't Stop" was the album's first single, and the track was also released in an extended 12" remix version.  The album was almost entirely hard-driving rockers, without the power ballads of many other bands of the genre.  Original closer was "Do It", a tongue-in-cheek retro Louis Armstrong-style shuffle of the type David Lee Roth and David Johansen were experimenting with at the time.

After a decade and a half out of print, the album was re-released on CD by independent label MTM Classix in 2004.  The re-release includes lyrics and liner notes, including a new thank-you section.  The collection ends with two new bonus tracks.  he first, "Hardcore Romance", is in a rawer style, sans the keyboards prevalent throughout the original '80s recording.  The second, "Memories of You", makes up for the lack of balladry in the original track list, bringing back a subtler wash of keyboards and a subdued guitar.

Track listing 
All lyrics by Jeff Limbo, music as indicated

Side one
"Won't Stop" (Pete Steiner) – 3:21
"Hard as a Rock" (Steiner) – 3:47
"I Can't Stand Losing You" (Steiner) – 4:50
"Point of No Return" (Steiner, Hank Shermann) – 3:51
"The Hunter" (Shermann, Steiner) – 4:16

Side two
"Summerlove" (Steiner) – 4:00
"Farrah" (Shermann, Steiner) – 3:53
"Get Up and Go" (Shermann) – 3:21
"Limbo a Go Go" (Steiner) – 4:04
"Do It" (Limbo) – 2:34

2004 CD edition bonus tracks
"Hardcore Romance"
"Memories of You"

Personnel 
Fate
Jeff "Lox" Limbo – vocals
Hank Shermann – guitar
Pete Steiner – bass, keyboards
Bob Lance – drums

Additional musicians
Kjetil Bjerkestrand – additional keyboards
Svein Dag Hauge – additional guitar
Egil Eldøen, Frank Ådahl, Lis Dam – backing vocals

Production
Svein Dag Hauge – producer
Sverre Erik Henriksen – engineer
Kim Petersen, Morten Henningsen – assistant engineers

References 

1986 albums
EMI Records albums
Fate (band) albums